Phaon is a small genus of damselflies belonging to the family Calopterygidae. They occur in central and southern Africa and Madagascar.

The genus contains three species:
Phaon camerunensis  – Forest Flashwing
Phaon iridipennis  – Glistening Demoiselle
Phaon rasoherinae from Madagascar

References

Calopterygidae
Zygoptera genera
Taxa named by Edmond de Sélys Longchamps